Muhammad Sualeh Ahmad Faruqi is a Pakistani civil servant who serves in BPS-22 grade as the Commerce Secretary of Pakistan, in office since July 2020. Faruqi belongs to the Pakistan Administrative Service and was promoted to the rank of Federal Secretary in June 2020. He hails from Sindh and holds a master's degree from the London School of Economics.

Faruqi has previously served as Joint Secretary to Prime Minister Nawaz Sharif, Principal Secretary to Sindh Governor Muhammad Zubair Umar and as Chairman Employees Old-Age Benefits Institution (EOBI).

Career
Sualeh Faruqi serves as the Commerce Secretary of Pakistan, in office since July 2020.  He has previously served as Joint Secretary to Prime Minister Nawaz Sharif, Principal Secretary to Sindh Governor Muhammad Zubair Umar, Chairman Employees Old-Age Benefits Institution (EOBI) and as Director General Sindh Provincial Disaster Management Authority.

See also
Naveed Kamran Baloch
Rizwan Ahmed
Fawad Hasan Fawad
Jawad Rafique Malik

References

Pakistani civil servants
Government of Pakistan
Pakistani government officials
Year of birth missing (living people)
Living people